Arthur Noyes may refer to:

 Arthur Amos Noyes (1866–1936), American chemist, inventor and educator
 Arthur Noyes (organist) (1862–1929), church organist in South Australia
 Arthur Percy Noyes (1880–1963), psychiatric administrator and educator
 Arthur H. Noyes (1853–1915), U.S. federal judge